Bickley is a former civil parish, now in the parish of No Man's Heath and District, in the unitary authority of Cheshire West and Chester and ceremonial county of Cheshire, England. According to the 2001 Census it had a population of 498, reducing slightly to 481 at the 2011 census. The parish included the villages of Bickley Town and Bickley Moss. The civil parish was abolished in 2015 to form No Man's Heath and District.

The name is Anglo-Saxon in origin, and relates to bees.

The parish church is St Wenefrede's, a grade-II-listed sandstone building designed by John Douglas and Daniel Porter Fordham.

See also

Listed buildings in Bickley, Cheshire

References

Former civil parishes in Cheshire
Cheshire West and Chester